The 17th Cartoon Art Trust Awards, hosted by the Cartoon Art Trust, owners and operators of the Cartoon Museum, were held in October 2013 at the Mall Galleries in London, honouring the best cartoons of 2013. The award ceremony was hosted by cartoonist and museum chairman Oliver Preston.

Winners
 British Cartoonists' Association Young Cartoonist of the Year Award - Under 18 Category: Harry McSweeney 
 British Cartoonists' Association Young Cartoonist of the Year Award - Under 30 Category: Will McPhail 
 CAT Award for Joke Cartooning: Kipper Williams
 CAT Award for Strip Cartooning: Mike Barfield (for the cartoon strip "Apparently" in Private Eye).
 CAT Award for Caricature: Peter Shrank 
 CAT Award for Political Cartooning: Peter Brookes 
 CAT Award for Pocket Cartooning: Matt (Matthew Pritchett)
 The Heneage Cup: The Cartoon Art Trust Lifetime Achievement Award" Nicholas Garland

See also
 British Cartoonists' Association
 Cartoon Art Trust
 Cartoon Art Trust Awards
 Cartoon Museum

References

External links
 Cartoon Museum

2013 in London
October 2013 events in the United Kingdom
2013 in art